is a city in Kanagawa Prefecture, Japan. , the city had an estimated population of 163,787 and a population density of 1600 persons per km².

Geography
Hadano is located in the foothills of the Tanzawa Mountains in west-central Kanagawa Prefecture and is approximately 12.8 kilometers north-to-south by 13.6 kilometers east-to west.  About half of the city area is within the borders of the Tanzawa-Ōyama Quasi-National Park.

Surrounding municipalities
Kanagawa Prefecture
Atsugi
Isehara
Hiratsuka
Ōi, Nakai, Matsuda, Yamakita
Kiyokawa

Climate
Hadano has a Humid subtropical climate (Köppen Cfa) characterized by warm summers and cool winters with light to no snowfall.  The average annual temperature in Hadano is 13.4 °C. The average annual rainfall is 1906 mm with September as the wettest month. The temperatures are highest on average in August, at around 24.2 °C, and lowest in January, at around 2.9 °C.

Demographics
Per Japanese census data, the population of Hadano has grown steadily over the past 70 years.

History
The name "Hadano" appears as a geographic term in the Heian period Wamyō Ruijushō, as "Hatano", and there has been scholarly speculation as to possible connections with the Nara period Hata clan. From the late Heian period until the Kamakura period, the area was divided into shōen controlled by descendants of Fujiwara no Hidesato, including the Sengoku-period daimyō, the Hatano clan. During the Edo period, it was nominally part of Odawara Domain, although large portions were tenryō territory controlled by the shōgun in Edo through various hatamoto.

On 26 March 1896, Ōsumi District and Yurugi District were merged to form Naka District. The town began to experience rapid growth after the opening of the Odakyu Electric Railway in 1927. Hadano became a city on 1 January 1955, through the merger of former towns of Hadano and Minamihadano with the villages of Kitahadano and Higashihadano. The new city annexed neighboring the village of One, and the village of Kamihatano (from Ashigarakami District) later the same year, and annexed the town of Nishihadano in 1964.

Government
Hadano has a mayor-council form of government with a directly elected mayor and a unicameral city council of 24 members. Hadano contributes two members to the Kanagawa Prefectural Assembly. In terms of national politics, the city is part of Kanagawa 17th district of the lower house of the Diet of Japan.

Economy
Hadano was a regional commercial center during the Edo period following the introduction of tobacco cultivation to the area. The curtains closed on the industry's 300-year history in 1984, and the local farmers have largely converted to production of green tea and ornamental flowers. A former tobacco-trading center and processing plant belonging to Japan Tobacco and Salt Public Corporation (now Japan Tobacco) has been replaced by a large shopping mall.

Education
Hadano has 13 public elementary schools and nine public middle schools operated by the city government. The city has three public high schools operated by the Kanagawa Prefectural Board of Education, and the prefecture also operates one special education school for the handicapped. A private junior college, the Sophia Junior College is located within Hadano.

Transportation

Railway
 Odakyu Electric Railway – Odakyū Odawara Line
  -  -  -

Highways
 Hadano-Nakai Interchange
, to central Tokyo and Numazu
, to Odawara

Local attractions
Tanzawa Mountains
Tsurumaki Hot Spring
Mount Ōyama
Hadano Castle ruins
Sakuradote Kofun Park

Sister cities
  Suwa, Nagano, Japan
  Pasadena, Texas, United States
  Paju, Gyeonggi-do, South Korea
  General Santos, Soccsksargen, Philippines

Notable people from Hadano

Inoran, musician, singer-songwriter, rhythm guitarist and co-founder of the J-rock band Luna Sea (Real Name: Kiyonobu Inoue, Nihongo: 井上 清信, Inoue Kiyonobu)
J, musician, singer-songwriter, record producer, bassist and co-founder of the J-rock band Luna Sea (Real Name: Jun Onose, Nihongo: 小野瀬 潤, Onose Jun)
Rinko Kikuchi, Japanese actress (Real Name: Yuriko Kikuchi, Nihongo: 菊地 百合子, Kikuchi Yuriko)
Izumi Sakai, singer-songwriter, pop singer and member of the group Zard (Real Name: Sachiko Kamachi, Nihongo: 蒲池 幸子, Kamachi Sachiko) – Originally from Hiratsuka, Kanagawa
Sugizo, musician, singer-songwriter, record producer, composer, lead guitarist, violinist and member of the J-rock band Luna Sea (Real Name: Yūne Sugihara, Nihongo: 杉原 有音, Sugihara Yūne/Yasuhiro Sugihara, Nihongo: 杉原 康弘, Sugihara Yasuhiro)
Shinya, musician, media personality, entrepreneur, drummer and member of the J-rock band Luna Sea (Real Name: Shinya Yamada, Nihongo: 山田 真矢, Yamada Shin'ya)

References

External links

Official website 

 
Cities in Kanagawa Prefecture